The East-West Stadium is a football stadium in Fairmont, West Virginia. The stadium was built in 1938 using Works Progress Administration funding. The stadium is operated and owned by the Marion County Board of Education. The stadium is the sight of the football rivalry between Fairmont's two high schools: Fairmont Senior High School and East Fairmont High School.

References 

American football venues in West Virginia
Sports in Fairmont, West Virginia
Sports venues completed in 1938
Works Progress Administration in West Virginia
Buildings and structures in Marion County, West Virginia